Gan Rongkun (born May 1962) is a former Chinese politician. He was investigated by China's top anti-graft agency in June 2021. He entered the workforce in July 1983, and joined the Chinese Communist Party (CCP) in April 1996. Previously he was secretary of the Henan Provincial Politics and Law Commission and a member of the Standing Committee of the CCP Henan Provincial Committee.

Career
Gan was born in Pengze County, Jiangxi, in May 1962. After the resumption of college entrance examination, he entered Jiangxi University of Finance and Economics in 1979, where he majored in finance and accounting. After graduating in 1983, he was dispatched to the China Earthquake Administration. Beginning in April 1989, he served in several posts in the General Administration of Customs, including economist, deputy section chief, and section chief. He was director of the Beijing Customs in September 2007, and held that office until July 2013. In August 2013, he was transferred to central China's Hubei province and appointed vice governor. In July 2016, he was transferred to northeast China's Heilongjiang province and became a member of the Standing Committee of the CPC Heilongjiang Provincial Committee, concurrently holding the secretary of the Heilongjiang Provincial Politics and Law Commission position. He was assigned to the similar position in north China's Henan province in September 2019.

Downfall
On June 1, 2021, he was put under investigation for alleged "serious violations of discipline and laws" by the Central Commission for Discipline Inspection (CCDI), the party's internal disciplinary body, and the National Supervisory Commission, the highest anti-corruption agency of China. On December 1, he was expelled from the CCP and dismissed from public office. He was detained by the Supreme People's Procuratorate on December 20.

References

1962 births
Living people
People from Pengze County
Jiangxi University of Finance and Economics alumni
Delegates to the 13th National People's Congress
People's Republic of China politicians from Jiangxi
Chinese Communist Party politicians from Jiangxi